The  or  is Japan's only network of multi-lingual commercial radio stations. The network was established in December 1999. Currently all such stations are members of the network. The flagship station is InterFM in Tokyo. 

They all broadcast in FM. It is the latest network, third national FM network and the fifth in radio in general in Japan.

Operation
As a network of foreign-language focused FM radio stations which serve four major metropolitan areas, MegaNet reaches about 65% of Japan's population. However, unlike the rival network JFL, MegaNet doesn't have an affiliate in Hokkaido. MegaNet lost an affiliate in Aichi Prefecture when Radio-i closed in 2010, reducing its affiliates to three; MegaNet returned to Aichi in April 2014 as InterFM Nagoya and change name as Radio Neo in October 2015.

Initially, it was planned that affiliate stations in the network would only share information and produce and broadcast shows independently. However, recently the network has begun to broadcast flagship station InterFM's programming across the entire network.

During the 2002 FIFA World Cup held in Japan and Korea, the network capitalized on the fact that it was targeted towards foreigners by being the only FM network offering live coverage of Japan's games, as well as broadcasting news in English to foreign tourists in the country for the games. (MegaNet is a member of the Japan Consortium). They also broadcast games from the 2006 FIFA World Cup in Germany in conjunction with other radio stations, however FM COCOLO did not participate.

MegaNet stations

Current

Defunct

References
:ja:MegaNet as of 2007-06-05T22:26.

Radio in Japan
Japanese radio networks
Radio stations established in 1999
1999 establishments in Japan